This is a list of venues used by the National Lacrosse League, a men's professional indoor lacrosse league in North America. It has teams in Canada and in the United States.

 Air Canada Centre
 Amway Arena
 Baltimore Arena
 Ball Arena
 Bell Centre
 Blue Cross Arena
 Bojangles' Coliseum
 Boston Garden
 Canadian Tire Centre
 Capital Centre
 Capital One Arena
 Civic Arena (Pittsburgh)
 Comcast Arena (Everett)
 DCU Center
 Dickies Arena
 First Niagara Center
 FirstOntario Centre
 Gas South Arena
 Honda Center
 Izod Center
 Jobing.com Arena
 Joe Louis Arena
 Keybank Center
 Langley Events Centre
 Michelob Ulta Arena
 Moda Center
 MVP Arena
 Nassau Veterans Memorial Coliseum
 Nationwide Arena
 Oncenter War Memorial Arena
 Pechanga Arena
 Pepsi Center
 Prudential Center
 Rexall Place
 Rogers Arena
 SAP Center at San Jose
 SaskTel Centre
 Scotiabank Saddledome
 Sears Centre
 Snapdragon Stadium
 TD Garden
 TD Place Arena
 Times Union Center
 Wells Fargo Center (Philadelphia)
 Xcel Energy Center

National Lacrosse League
Venues
Lacrosse
Lacrosse